Decio Caracciolo Rosso (died 27 May 1613) was a Roman Catholic prelate who served as Archdiocese of Bari (-Canosa) (1606–1613).

Biography
On 21 September 1577, Decio Caracciolo Rosso was ordained to the priesthood. On 3 July 1606, he was appointed during the papacy of Pope Paul V as Archdiocese of Bari-Canosa. On 1 October 1606, he was consecrated bishop by Giovanni Battista Costanzo, Archbishop of Cosenza, with Alessandro Cospi, Bishop of Bisceglie, and Giovanni Antonio Viperani, Bishop of Giovinazzo, serving as co-consecrators. He served as Bishop of Bari (-Canosa) until his death on 27 May 1613.

While bishop, he was the principal co-consecrator of Fulvio Tesorieri, Bishop of Belcastro (1612) and Selvaggio Primitelli, Bishop of Lavello (1613).

References

External links and additional sources
 (for Chronology of Bishops) 
 (for Chronology of Bishops) 

17th-century Roman Catholic archbishops in the Kingdom of Naples
Bishops appointed by Pope Paul V
1613 deaths